was a railway station on the Senmō Main Line in Teshikaga, Hokkaido, Japan, operated by the Hokkaido Railway Company (JR Hokkaido). It was numbered "B63".

Lines

Station layout
The station had one side platform serving a single bidirectional track.

Adjacent stations

History
The station opened on 15 August 1929. With the privatization of Japanese National Railways (JNR) on 1 April 1987, the station came under the control of JR Hokkaido.

On 14 March 2020, this station was closed due to low numbers of passengers.

See also
 List of railway stations in Japan

References

Stations of Hokkaido Railway Company
Railway stations in Hokkaido Prefecture
Railway stations in Japan opened in 1929